Valentin Nikolayevich Pluchek (4 September 1909 —  17 August 2002) was a Russian theatre director. He is known as a stage director of the Physical Culture Day parade in Moscow during the Stalinist epoch. The Physical Culture Day took place each summer at central squares of major Soviet cities. Peter Brook's cousin.

Pluchek worked with the director Vsevolod Meyerhold until he was arrested and shot in 1940, and then worked with the playwright Alexei Arbuzov. In 1950, he joined the "often-daring" Moscow Satire Theatre in 1950, and rose to chief director in 1957.

Awards and titles
 Honored Artist of the RSFSR (1956)
 People's Artist of the RSFSR (1964)
 People's Artist of the USSR (1974)
 Order of the Patriotic War 2nd class (1985)
 Order of the Red Banner of Labour
 Order of Friendship of Peoples
 Order "For Merit to the Fatherland" 3rd class (1999)

References

1909 births
2002 deaths
Soviet male actors
Theatre people from Moscow
Russian male actors
Soviet theatre directors
Recipients of the Order "For Merit to the Fatherland", 3rd class
People's Artists of the USSR
People's Artists of the RSFSR
Honored Artists of the RSFSR
Burials at Vagankovo Cemetery
Jewish Russian actors